Zaccar is a town and commune in Djelfa Province, Algeria. According to the 1998 census it has a population of 3,142.

Tourist Attractions

Al-Daqourin Monastery 
To the southeast of the municipality of Zakar, about 02 km away, we find “Deir al-Daqourin”, the site discovered in 1907 by Judge “Maun”, which has been classified as a national heritage since 1982 and consists of:

A- A rock cache that displays a wonderful painting of a moving hunting scene that highlights the real-time movement of the natural direct relationship between two types of animals: the lion and the deer, in addition to a group of animals: the ostrich, the four elephants, the moors, the cow...

B- A rhinoceros mural in the side view

C- Women's mural

References

Communes of Djelfa Province